Peyanvilai is a village in the taluk of Tiruchendur and in Thoothukudi district in the state of Tamil Nadu, India.

Geography 

The village lies between Tuticorin - Tiruchendur connecting Local Fund (LF) Road.  2 km from the sea shore of Bay of Bengal.  4 km from the delta of Tamirabarani river.

Peyanvilai has very old temples and tradition practices over several centuries

 Arulmigu Vada Pathirakali Amman Temple
 Arulmigu Thiru Ponmada Swamy Temple
 Thiru Dharma Kutti Sastha Temple
 Arulmigu Papathi Amman Temple
 Arulmigu Bramasakthi Amman Temple
 Arulmigu Katterum Perumal Temple
 Arulmigu sri vinaitirkkum vinayakar tirukkovil

Culture 

The festival / carnival for the temple celebrated for a week with traditional Tamil folk dance like villu pattu, karagattam, mullai pattu.  The entire village is decorated with colourful light.  The people who stay across India belongs to this village will attend the celebration.  
The prime occupation of the people are agriculture and many of them own salt panels. Many of the people from Village migrated to cities like Chennai, Coimbatore, Tirupur, Mumbai etc. and became Industrialists and Business men. Most of them own Hardware stores and big Grocery stores in Chennai. The sacred birds like peacock, barmy kite (Alwar) are plenty to see in this village.  The age of the tree in this temple is predicted more than 1000 years.

Habits 

The food is prepared very tasty in this village with traditional mud pot and fuel wood stoves.  During the night we can see the lights of industries in the Tuticorin Belt.  The night view of Tuticorin harbour seen from 25 km look so good like lamps on the sea.  The curve in the Indian map can be visually seen.
This village have wise people with out calendar and clock predict the rain, astrology.  They take herbs in their routine food as medicine.

Education 

Many are well educated in this generation and importance to education is given in the previous two generations as well. 
K.A. Hr Sec School (Kayalpatnam Arumuganeri Higher Secondary School) and Hindu Primary School are the two prominent schools located in Peyanvilai. People from this place study in other schools like Kamlavati Higher Secondary School (C.B.S.E)in Sahupuram and also in other near by educational institutions. Men from this Village mostly pursue their Under graduation and Post graduation degrees from Adithanar college and Women go to Govindammal College and students study Engineering mostly in Dr. Sivanthi Adithanar Engineering college in Tiruchendur.

References 

Villages in Thoothukudi district